Phakomatosis pigmentokeratotica is a rare neurocutanous condition  characterized by the combination of an organoid sebaceous nevus and speckled lentiginous nevus. It is an unusual variant of  epidermal naevus syndrome. It was first described by Happle et al. It is often associated with neurological or skeletal anomalies such as hemiatrophy, dysaesthesia and hyperhidrosis in a segmental pattern, mild mental retardation, seizures, deafness, ptosis and strabismus.

See also 
 Skin lesion
 List of cutaneous conditions associated with increased risk of nonmelanoma skin cancer

References

External links 

Epidermal nevi, neoplasms, and cysts
Dermal and subcutaneous growths
Neurocutaneous conditions
Rare diseases